

UCI Road World Rankings

World Championships

Olympic Games

UCI World Cup

Source:

Single day races (1.1 and 1.2)

Stage races (2.1 and 2.2)

Continental Championships

African Championship

Asian Championships

European Championships (under-23)

Oceania Championships

Pan American Championships

National Championships

UCI teams

References

See also
2012 in men's road cycling

 
 
Women's road cycling by year